|}

This is a list of electoral district results for the 1918 Queensland state election.

At the time, the voting system in Queensland was based on contingency voting, which was similar to the modern optional preferential voting system. In electorates with 3 or more candidates, preferences were not distributed if a candidate received more than 50% of the primary vote.

If none received more than 50%, all except the top two candidates were eliminated from the count and their preferences distributed between the two leaders, with the one receiving the most votes declared the winner.

Results by electoral district

Albert 

 Sitting member John Appel was elected unopposed at the previous election as a Farmers Union candidate. He joined the National QLD 1917 party before this election.

Aubigny 

 Sitting member Arthur Edward Moore was elected at the previous election as a Farmers Union candidate. He joined the National QLD 1917 party before this election.

Balonne

Barcoo

By-election 

 This by-election was caused by the resignation of T. J. Ryan to enter Federal politics. It was held on 20 December 1919.

Bowen

Bremer

Brisbane

Bulimba

Bundaberg

Buranda

Burke

Burnett

Burrum

Cairns

Carnarvon

Charters Towers

Chillagoe

Cook

Cooroora

Cunningham

Dalby

Drayton 

 Sitting member William Bebbington was elected at the previous election as a Farmers Union candidate. He joined the National QLD 1917 party before this election.

Eacham

East Toowoomba

Enoggera

Fassifern

Fitzroy

Flinders

Fortitude Valley

Gregory

Gympie

Herbert

By-election 

 This by-election was caused by the appointment of William Lennon as Lieutenant Governor of Queensland. It was held on 10 April 1920.

Ipswich

Ithaca

Kennedy

Keppel

Kurilpa

Leichhardt

By-election 

 This by-election was caused by the appointment of Herbert Hardacre to the Land Court. It was held on 20 December 1919.

Lockyer

Logan

Mackay

Maranoa

By-election 

 This by-election was caused by the resignation of John Hunter to take up the role of the Queensland Agent-General in England. It was held on 20 December 1919.

Maree 

 Preferences were not distributed.

Maryborough

Merthyr

Mitchell

Mirani

Mount Morgan

Mundingburra

Murilla

Murrumba

Musgrave

Nanango 

 Sitting member Robert Hodge was elected at the previous election as a Farmers Union candidate. He joined the National QLD 1917 Party before this election.

Normanby

Nundah

Oxley

Paddington

Pittsworth

Port Curtis

Queenton 

 Preferences were not distributed.

Rockhampton

Rosewood

South Brisbane

Stanley

Toombul

Toowong

Toowoomba

Townsville

Warrego

Warwick

Wide Bay

Windsor

See also 

 1918 Queensland state election
 Candidates of the Queensland state election, 1918
 Members of the Queensland Legislative Assembly, 1918-1920

References 

Results of Queensland elections